Nakshathrakkannulla Rajakumaran Avanundoru Rajakumari is a 2002 Indian Malayalam-language romantic drama film directed by Rajasenan and starring Prithviraj Sukumaran and Gayathri Raghuram.

Plot
Nakshathrakkannulla Rajakumaran Avanundoru Rajakumari revolves around a family that claims that they are the descendants of the brave Thacholi Othenan, who was the warrior of the Vadakkanpaattu. Bhageerathi Amma has two sons, Veerabhadra Kurup and Kochchukurup, and a daughter Subhadra, who constantly feud with each other. The elder Kurup's daughter Aswathy is in love with her muracherukkan, Subhadra's son Ananthu, but their parents object to the match. They are encouraged by Chandutty, Bhaskaran and Shankunni. They hope that Aswathy's brother Karthik will come to their rescue. But he turns against the lovers on the advice of his father. Suddenly, Raziya Begum turns up, claiming to be Karthik's lover. Ananthu and his gang use this opportunity to fix Karthik, and Kochukurup gives them a lot of muscle support. Rasiya gets pregnant thus kurup decides to kill Anandhu & Rasiya. Kochukurup and gang rescues them with the help of Karthik. Later, Aswathy and Anandhu runs away. After a lot of buffoonery and mistaken identity, both the families gets united. They accepts Rasiya and later Achu and Ananthu gets united with their family.

Cast
Prithviraj Sukumaran as Ananthu 
Gayathri Raghuram as Aswathy 
Rayan Raj as Karthik 
Anjali Krishna as Raziya 
Narendra Prasad as Adv Veerabhadra Kurup 
Cicily Joy as Subhadra
Kalabhavan Mani as Kochu Kurup 
Jagathy Sreekumar as Chanthutty 
Sabumon Abdusamad as Bhaskaran 
 Kundara Johny as Kunju Raman 
Shobha Mohan as Janaki 
K. R. Vijaya as Bhageerathiyamma 
Munshi Baiju as Sankunny 
Archana Menon as Athira
 Usha as Cheeru
 Sreekala Thaha as Chanthutty's mother
 Mithun Ramesh Voice only for Karthik

Production
Although Nandanam was the first film Prithviraj shot for, this film released first.

References

External links
 

2000s Malayalam-language films
2000s romance films
2002 films
Films directed by Rajasenan
Indian romantic drama films
Films shot in Kollam